Daktari (subtitled Shelly Manne Performs & Conducts His Original Music for the Hit TV Show) is an album by drummer Shelly Manne recorded in 1967 featuring music from Daktari and released on the Atlantic label. On the album, Mike Wofford plays a tack piano to evoke an African sound, and Manne is joined by percussionists Emil Richards, Larry Bunker, Frank Carlson, and Victor Feldman. According to the liner notes, Manne and fellow percussionists play ankle and wrist jingles, Thai mouth organs, angklungs, ocarinas, vibraphones, tympani, and different kinds of marimbas.

Reception

Steely Dan guitarist Walter Becker was a fan of the album's "vaguely African" music, sounding like it came from "Hollywood session players" rather than actual Africans. In the late 1990s, Becker modeled a percussion sequence after this style on the song "Two Against Nature" released on the Steely Dan album of the same name.

Track listing
All compositions by Shelly Manne
 "Daktari" - 2:14
 "Out on a Limb" - 3:04
 "Clarence" - 2:18
 "Africa" - 3:10
 "Stay With Me" - 2:46
 "Elephantime" - 2:21
 "Wameru" - 2:56
 "Toto" - 2:44
 "Galloping Giraffes" - 3:11
 "Judy Judy" - 2:37
 "Ivan" - 2:27
 "Rhino Trot" - 1:51

Personnel
Shelly Manne – drums, percussion
Justin Gordon, Bud Shank, Arthur C. Smith, Frank Strozier – woodwinds
Mike Wofford – piano
Bob Bain – guitar
Bill Pitman – bass
Larry Bunker, Frank Carlsson, Victor Feldman, Emil Richards – percussion
Richard Hazard – arranger

References

External Links
 

1967 albums
Atlantic Records albums
Shelly Manne albums
albums arranged by Richard Hazard
Albums produced by Nesuhi Ertegun